Healey is a district of Batley, which is part of the Kirklees district, West Yorkshire, England.

Healey is located between Batley and Heckmondwike. The 2001 census counted a population of 3,011.
Healey contains several council housing estates, one of which was referred to as "Tin Town" and is currently undergoing development with a mix of social housing.

Jessop's Park is a local green space in Healey.

External links

pdf file including statistics and map

Villages in West Yorkshire
Geography of Batley